The Maguen David Synagogue in San Pedro Sula, Honduras is one of the two synagogue in San Pedro Sula where the Orthodox Synagogue Mishkan Shlomo was founded in 2022, these 3 are the only synagogues in the entire country. Built in 1997, it serves as the central gathering place of the tiny Jewish community of San Pedro Sula.

References 

Conservative Judaism in North America
Sephardi Conservative Judaism
Conservative synagogues
Synagogues in Honduras
Buildings and structures in San Pedro Sula
Sephardi Jewish culture in North America
Sephardi synagogues